Trials is an open access peer-reviewed medical journal covering performance and outcomes of randomized controlled trials. The journal is published by BioMed Central; the editors-in-chief are Jeremy Grimshaw (Ottawa Health Research Institute), Peter Jüni (University of Toronto), Tianjing Li (Johns Hopkins Bloomberg School of Public Health), and Shaun Treweek (University of Aberdeen). It also publishes study protocols.

Abstracting and indexing 
The journal is abstracted and indexed in:

According to the Journal Citation Reports, the journal has a 2018 impact factor of 1.975.

References

External links 
 

BioMed Central academic journals
General medical journals
Clinical trials
Creative Commons Attribution-licensed journals
Publications established in 2006